Biandina, also known as Biadyna (Βιάδυνα), Biandyna (Βιάνδυνα), Biadinupolis or Biadinoupolis (Βιαδινουπολίς), was a town of ancient Laconia, located between Acriae and Asopus. Its name appears in an inscription reported by August Böckh. 

Its site is located near the modern Elia/Elaia.

References

Populated places in ancient Laconia
Former populated places in Greece